The archery competitions at the 2013 Mediterranean Games in Mersin took place between 22 June and 24 June at the Macit Özcan Sports Complex. For the first time since 2005, archery competitions were held.

Athletes competed in four recurve archery events.

Medal summary

Medalists

Medal table
Key:

References

Sports at the 2013 Mediterranean Games
2013
2013 in archery
International archery competitions hosted by Turkey